National Tertiary Route 328, or just Route 328 (or ) is a National Road Route of Costa Rica, located in the San José province.

Description
In San José province the route covers Pérez Zeledón canton (San Isidro de El General, Río Nuevo districts).

References

Highways in Costa Rica